EMAS CANADA is a Christian interdenominational non-governmental organization (NGO) providing charitable medical and dental care to under-serviced areas throughout the world.

EMAS was founded in 1948, the EMAS CANADA national office is located in Burlington, Ontario.

EMAS supports local healthcare endeavours/initiatives and sends medical, surgical and dental teams of healthcare professionals to assist in under-serviced areas overseas.

References

External links
 Official website of EMAS CANADA

Medical and health organizations based in Ontario
Health charities in Canada
Organizations based in Ontario
Burlington, Ontario
Religious organizations based in Canada
1948 establishments in Ontario